TRO or tro may refer to:

Music
 Tro (instrument), Cambodian string instrument 
 "Tro" (song), 1996, Marie Fredriksson
 The Richmond Organization, Inc., American music publisher

Other uses
 TRO (gene) or trophinin, a human protein involved in cell adhesion
 TRO (company), American architects
 Televisión Regional del Oriente, Colombian television network
 Tamils Rehabilitation Organisation
 Temporary restraining order, in American law
 Taree Airport, New South Wales, Australia (IATA code: TRO)